The Tigger Movie is a 2000 animated musical comedy-drama film produced by Walt Disney Television Animation with animation production by Walt Disney Animation (Japan), Inc., written and directed by Jun Falkenstein from a story by Eddie Guzelian, and released by Walt Disney Pictures on February 11, 2000. It is the second theatrical Winnie the Pooh film after The Many Adventures of Winnie the Pooh and features Pooh's friend Tigger as the main protagonist searching for his family tree and other Tiggers like himself.

The film was the first feature-length theatrical Pooh film that was not a collection of previously released shorts.

It is also the first in the original films in which Tigger is voiced entirely by Jim Cummings (in addition to Pooh) following the retirement of Tigger's original voice actor Paul Winchell in 1999. Winchell was originally cast as Tigger but was dropped after the studio considered his voice to be too raspy. Cummings had previously shared the role with Winchell since 1989 and provided his singing voice in most later projects with Winchell as the character's speaking voice.

The film features original songs from the Sherman Brothers. Originally, the film was slated for a direct-to-video release, until then–Disney CEO Michael Eisner heard the Sherman Brothers' songs and decided to release the film in theaters worldwide. The film received mixed reviews from critics and was the highest-grossing film in the Winnie the Pooh franchise until it was surpassed by 2018's Christopher Robin.

The film received three nominations on the Annie Awards, including the Annie Award for Directing in a Feature Production, the Annie Award for Voice Acting in a Feature Production, and the Annie Award for Music in a Feature Production.

Plot 
In the Hundred Acre Wood, Tigger searches for someone to bounce with him, but all of his friends are busy preparing for the upcoming winter. While searching for a playmate, Tigger inadvertently destroys Eeyore's house with a boulder. Tigger attempts to help his friends remove the boulder, but accidentally destroys Rabbit's mechanical pulley system. Frustrated, Rabbit and the rest of Tigger's friends reprimand him for his troublesome rambunctious nature. Tigger's closest friend Roo, seeing Tigger's sadness and alienation, asks him if he has any family members of his own. Tigger is fascinated by the concept and decides to search for his family, hoping to finally be within a similar company.

Misunderstanding Owl's advice, Tigger and Roo begin searching for his family tree, believing it to be a centuries-old tree covered in stripes and with many Tiggers upon it. After his search fails, Roo suggests that he write a letter to his family and he does so. He lets the wind carry it away with hopes that it will reach his family, but receives no response after days of waiting and begins to lose hope. Tigger's friends sympathetically decide to write him a letter; everyone contributes a bit of friendly advice and signs it "your family". Tigger misinterprets the content of the letter and comes to believe that his family exists and is intending to visit him, with the others unable to tell him the truth. He organizes a large and absurd party in preparation for a family reunion. Roo, wishing to uphold Tigger's spirits, encourages his friends to disguise themselves as Tiggers and attend his party. Rabbit refuses to join, and berates the others for not preparing for the harsh conditions ahead.

After a great effort in disguising themselves and learning to behave like Tiggers, Tigger's friends arrive at his party. He completely falls for the disguises until Roo's mask falls off after an attempt to imitate a complex bounce that Tigger had taught him earlier. Tigger, disappointed and betrayed by his friends' deception, sets out into a blizzard in search of his real family. He eventually finds an immense tree that the snow has whitened with stripes, convincing him that it is the family tree he had sought, but is saddened when he finds no one waiting for him there. Tigger's friends set out on an expedition in search of him, but they fail to persuade him to come home. Their argument causes an avalanche, which drives Tigger to rescue his friends. When Tigger has swept away himself, Roo successfully performs Tigger's bounce and saves him. When the avalanche subsides, Tigger's friends reveal their authorship of the letter by reciting their contributions. Tigger finally realizes that his friends are his true family, and he throws a new party in honor of them.

Cast 

 Jim Cummings as Tigger and Winnie the Pooh 
 Nikita Hopkins as Roo
 Ken Sansom as Rabbit
 John Fiedler as Piglet
 Peter Cullen as Eeyore
 Andre Stojka as Owl
 Kath Soucie as Kanga
 Tom Attenborough as Christopher Robin
 John Hurt as the Narrator

Production 
Paul Winchell, the original voice of Tigger, was originally cast to voice Tigger for the film, which was then titled Winnie the Pooh and the Family Tree. During Spring 1998, Winchell participated in a single recording session for the film. However, he was dropped from the project after the studio found his voice too raspy. The role was given to Jim Cummings, who was already voicing Winnie the Pooh for the film, and had voiced Tigger on various Disney television shows and for Disney consumer products. When the Disney Imagineers heard about Winchell's dismissal, they hired him to perform the voice of Tigger for The Many Adventures of Winnie the Pooh attraction at Magic Kingdom, which opened a year before The Tigger Movie'''s release; it was Winchell's final performance before his retirement from acting in 1999 and his death in 2005.

 Music 
The songs for The Tigger Movie were written by Robert and Richard Sherman who had not written a feature for Disney in over 28 years. Their last fully original feature film score was for the Oscar nominated film, Bedknobs and Broomsticks which was released in 1971. The Tigger Movie would also be the last film work for the Sherman Brothers and Robert B. Sherman due to his death on March 6, 2012. Originally slated for video or television release, the score was so well received (in demonstration form) by then Disney CEO, Michael Eisner, that the project's priority level moved up to feature theatrical release. This was due in great part to the perceived caliber of the song score throughout the studio. The score of the film is composed by Harry Gregson-Williams with additional music by Klaus Badelt and Steve Jablonsky and the score was conducted by Nick Glennie-Smith.

All the songs were original ones created for the film except for "The Wonderful Thing About Tiggers" which was originally written in 1968 for the featurette, Winnie the Pooh and the Blustery Day (released in 1968). That song was also by the Sherman Brothers. The "punch line" of the song: "But the most wonderful Thing About Tiggers is I'm the only one..." provides the basis of The Tigger Movies storyline. The vast majority of the songs, including "Someone Like Me", "Whoop-de-Dooper Bounce", "Pooh's Lullabee", and "Round My Family Tree" were performed by Jim Cummings, while "How to Be a Tigger" was performed by the cast.

"Your Heart Will Lead You Home" was the last song written for the film and is a collaborative effort between the Sherman Brothers and singer Kenny Loggins. Richard Sherman described the song as "a song about the picture, as opposed to songs of the picture." It marks the only time the trio worked together on a song.

The original theatrical trailer for the film featured the song "Semi-Charmed Life" by alternative band Third Eye Blind. A Disney spokeswoman said that she was not aware of the sexual content within the song's lyrics.

Songs
Original songs performed in the film include:

 Release 
After A Hollywood red carpet premiere on February 6, 2000 at El Capitan Theatre, the film was released theatrically on February 11, 2000. The movie was on screens for 23 weeks.

 Home media The Tigger Movie was originally released on August 22, 2000, on both VHS and DVD. Both included the Kenny Loggins music video "Your Heart Will Lead You Home." The DVD included additional special features. The film was later re-released on a 2-disc DVD on August 4, 2009 to coincide with its 10th anniversary. The 2-disc release includes a DVD and a digital copy. It contains all the 2000 DVD bonus features, but has more language tracks and special features. The film was also re-released as a Bounce-a-rrrific special edition on Blu-ray on August 21, 2012. It contains the Kenny Loggins music video "Your Heart Will Lead You Home" and "Round My Family Tree" sing-along song video but includes the 10 Mini Adventures of Winnie the Pooh segments.

 Reception 
 Box office 
The film opened at number 4 at the US box office making $9.4 million in its opening weekend. The film was a box office success, earning $45,554,533 in the United States and Canada and a further $50,605,267 overseas, resulting in a worldwide gross of $96,159,800. Its budget is estimated at between $15 million and $30 million. On its initial release on home video, it earned $90 million.

 Critical reception 
The review aggregator Rotten Tomatoes reported that 62% of critics gave the film positive reviews on 71 reviews with a 5.9 rating. The site's consensus states, "The Tigger Movie may lack the technological flash and underlying adult sophistication of other recent animated movies, but it's fun and charming." On Metacritic, the film has a weighted average score of 53 out of 100, based on twenty three critics, indicating "Mixed or average reviews". Audiences polled by CinemaScore gave the film an average grade of "A" on an A+ to F scale.

William Thomas of Empire Magazine gave the film a three out of four stars, saying: "And while the one-dimensional nature of the plot is unlikely to entertain anyone over the age of 11, the end result certainly includes enough pre-pubescent prerequisites to ensure that the furry fella will never bounce alone." Common Sense Media gave the film a three out of five stars and said: "Tigger's bouncy quest will appeal to younger viewers."

 Accolades 

 In other media 
 Sequels 
Disney released various theatrical and direct-to-videos in the years that followed. There were two theatrical animated films: Piglet's Big Movie in 2003 and Pooh's Heffalump Movie in 2005. Two direct-to-video animated films also followed, Winnie the Pooh: Springtime with Roo in 2004 and Pooh's Heffalump Halloween Movie'' in 2005.

References

External links 

 
 
 
 

2000 films
2000 animated films
2000s adventure comedy-drama films
2000s American animated films
2000s musical comedy-drama films
2000s English-language films
American buddy comedy films
American children's animated adventure films
American children's animated comedy films
American children's animated drama films
American children's animated musical films
American adventure comedy-drama films
American musical comedy-drama films
American sequel films
Animated drama films
Animated musical films
Animated buddy films
Animated films about animals
American animated feature films
Winnie the Pooh (franchise)
Children's comedy-drama films
Films scored by Harry Gregson-Williams
American films with live action and animation
Musicals by the Sherman Brothers
Walt Disney Pictures films
Winnie-the-Pooh films
Disney Television Animation films
2000 directorial debut films
Animated films about friendship
Avalanches in film
Films directed by Jun Falkenstein
Films about tigers